The T.S. Coogler House is a historic residence in Brooksville, Florida that belonged to pioneering educator and lawyer T.S. Coogler (Theodore Sylvestor Coogler). The home later belonged to Judge Monroe Treiman. It is located at 133 South Brooksville Avenue. The Colonial Revival architecture house has two-story columns. It is part of the South Brooksville Avenue Historic District.

Brooksville's second courthouse may have been built with lumber from Coogler's mill.

References

External links
Photo of T.S. Coogler's gravesite in Brooksville Cemetery
Contract from South Carolina for 14 year apprenticeship of a freedwoman's child to be "apprentice" and house servant to T.S. Coogler

Houses in Brooksville, Florida
Colonial Revival architecture in Florida